Ottó Csicsay (born 1961) is a Hungarian handball player. He participated at the 1988 Summer Olympics, where the Hungarian national team placed fourth, and at the 1992 Summer Olympics, where the team placed seventh.

References

1961 births
Living people
Hungarian male handball players
Olympic handball players of Hungary
Handball players at the 1988 Summer Olympics
Handball players at the 1992 Summer Olympics